Anger Room is a rage room in Dallas, Texas that rents out rooms furnished with common objects that people can then destroy.

It was opened in August 2008 by Donna Alexander.

References

Further reading 

 
 
 
 
 
 
 
 
 
 
 

Companies based in Dallas